KELT-4Ab is an extrasolar planet that orbits the star KELT-4A, in the star system KELT-4. The planet was discovered by the Kilodegree Extremely Little Telescope (KELT).

Planet
The exoplanet was discovered by transit and is a Hot Jupiter planet orbiting a star in a triple star system, KELT-4. It is the fourth planet found in such a system. As KELT-4A is the brightest host (V~10) of a Hot Jupiter in a hierarchical triple stellar system found so far researchers expect it may be useful in learning more about inflated planets.

Star system
KELT-4 is a triple star system.

See also
 Gliese 667 Cc, a planet in a triple star system
 KELT-2Ab, a previous planet discovered by the KELT survey, in a binary system
 KELT

References

External links
 KELT-North survey website 
 Open Exoplanet Catalogue Entry

Hot Jupiters
Transiting exoplanets
Exoplanets discovered in 2015
Exoplanets discovered by KELT
Leo (constellation)